The 2014–15 Botola 2 was the 53rd and current season of Botola 2, the second division of the Moroccan football league. Its started on 23 August 2014 and ended on 4 May 2015.

Teams
 Association Salé
 Chabab Houara
 COD Meknès
 IR Tanger
 JS Kasba Tadla
 JS Massira
 MC Oujda
 Olympique Dcheira
 Racing de Casablanca
 Raja Beni Mellal
 Union Aït Melloul
 Union de Mohammédia
 US Témara
 Wydad de Fès
 Wydad Témara
 Youssoufia Berrechid

League table

See also
 2014–15 Botola

External links
Fédération Royale Marocaine de Football

GNF 2 seasons
Moro
2014–15 in Moroccan football